Thiruthurapoondi Thiruvenkatam Vivekananda Dhinakaran (born 13 December 1963) is an Indian politician and founding General Secretary of Amma Makkal Munneetra Kazagam. In the past he was the Treasurer of All India Anna Dravida Munnetra Kazhagam Party and served as the Member of Rajya Sabha and Lok Sabha. He was expelled from the AIADMK in August 2017. He also served as former Member of the 15th Tamil Nadu Assembly from Dr. Radhakrishnan Nagar (2017-2021). He is the nephew of V. K. Sasikala. He won the highly anticipated RK Nagar by-election in December 2017. On 15 March 2018 Dhinakaran launched his political party named Amma Makkal Munnettra Kazagam.

Political career 
Dhinakaran was a Member of Lok Sabha, representing Periyakulam from 1999 to 2004, and was runner-up in the seat at 2004 general election when he was defeated by J. M. Aaron Rashid. In 2017 R.K Nagar by-election, he defeated AIADMK's candidate E. Madhusudhanan with a huge margin of votes as an Independent candidate. He assumed office of MLA on 29 December 2017.

Dinakaran was reinducted into the AIADMK and appointed deputy general secretary on 15 February 2017, hours before V. K. Sasikala left to surrender herself in the Bengaluru court to serve the jail term in a disproportionate assets case. He was expelled from the party on August, 2017 and launched his own party Amma Makkal Munnettra Kazagam (AMMK) on 15 March 2018. Dhinakaran announced that Sasikala would be the general secretary while he would be the deputy general secretary. On 19 April 2019, he was elected as the general secretary.

Lawsuit 
On 17 April 2017, Delhi police registered a case against Dhinakaran regarding an allegation of attempting to bribe the Election Commission of India (ECI) for the AIADMK's election symbol. It is claimed that a middle-man named Sukesh Chandrasekhar, who was raided and arrested in Delhi and was found with 13 million, which was allegedly meant as a bribe for the ECI in exchange for the symbol. Dinakaran has been charged with conspiracy and corruption in the case. In a recent development, the Tis Hazari Special Court granted him bail on the grounds that the police had failed to identify the public official allegedly bribed, accepting the argument made by his lawyer Aman Lekhi.

Elections

Tamil Nadu Legislative Assembly Elections
T. T. V. Dhinakaran represented Dr. Radhakrishnan Nagar in the Tamil Nadu Assembly from 2017 to 2021.

Electoral performance

Lok Sabha Elections

General Election 2004

General Election 1999

References

External links
  Official Biographical Sketch in Lok Sabha Website

Rajya Sabha members from Tamil Nadu
All India Anna Dravida Munnetra Kazhagam politicians
Living people
1963 births
India MPs 1999–2004
Lok Sabha members from Tamil Nadu
People from Theni district
Indian political party founders
Amma Makkal Munnetra Kazhagam politicians